Sandro Cutiño Castellano (born 3 March 1995) is a Cuban international footballer who plays as a defender for Brazilian side Força e Luz, on loan from Navegantes.

Career statistics

Club

Notes

International

References

1995 births
Living people
Cuban footballers
Cuban expatriate footballers
Cuba international footballers
Association football defenders
FC Las Tunas players
FC Sancti Spíritus players
Managua F.C. players
Expatriate footballers in Nicaragua
Expatriate footballers in Brazil
People from Las Tunas Province
Cuba under-20 international footballers
2015 CONCACAF U-20 Championship players